Prostanthera teretifolia, commonly known as turpentine bush, is a species of flowering plant in the family Lamiaceae and is endemic to a restricted area of New South Wales. It is an erect to spreading, aromatic shrub with more or less cylindrical leaves and bluish-purple flowers.

Description
Flowering usually occurs from August to December.

Taxonomy
Prostanthera teretifolia was first formally described in 1908 by Joseph Maiden and Ernst Betche in the Proceedings of the Linnean Society of New South Wales.

Distribution and habitat
Turpentine bush grows in open and exposed areas amongst granite outcrops near Torrington on the Northern Tablelands of New South Wales.

References

teretifolia
Flora of New South Wales
Lamiales of Australia
Plants described in 1908
Taxa named by Joseph Maiden
Taxa named by Ernst Betche